Gilbert Alexander Gabriel (born 16 November 1956) is a songwriter, film composer, producer and lecturer. He studied piano and clarinet at Dartington College of Arts and Goldsmiths before forming the British folk rock trio The Dream Academy, whose 1985 single "Life in a Northern Town" was a global hit, peaking within the top ten of the charts in Australia and the United States.

Since then he has been writing and producing music for film and television in the United Kingdom and Poland. He has also lectured on 'film and the soundtrack' in Cambridge as well as Liverpool and Cardiff University.

References

External links
An interview with Gilbert Gabriel
Recent update/brief bio
Official website

1956 births
Living people
Black British rock musicians
English rock keyboardists
The Dream Academy members
People educated at Sexey's School